Andrei S. Markovits is an Arthur F. Thurnau Professor and the Karl W. Deutsch Collegiate Professor of Comparative Politics and German Studies at the University of Michigan. He is the author and editor of many books, scholarly articles, conference papers, book reviews and newspaper contributions in English and many foreign languages on topics as varied as German and Austrian politics, anti-Semitism, anti-Americanism, social democracy, social movements, the European right and the European left. Markovits has also worked extensively on comparative sports culture in Europe and North America. In August 2021, Markovits published a memoir entitled The Passport as Home: Comfort in Rootlessness.

Biography

Early years
Andy Markovits was born in October 1948 in the west Romanian town of Timișoara. He was raised as the single child of a middle-class Jewish family, speaking German and Hungarian at home. In school he learned Romanian, and from his early childhood he was tutored in English—later in French as well. Thus, his multilingual identity dates back to his childhood as well as the polyglot part of the world where he grew up. At the age of nine, he and his father emigrated from Romania, first to Vienna and then to New York, the two cities that would play the most important roles in his upbringing. Between 1959 and 1967, he spent the school year—September through June—in Vienna; and the summer months in New York.

University and post-doctoral education
After being graduated from Vienna's prestigious Theresianische Akademie with a Matura degree (the Austrian equivalent of the German Abitur), Markovits enrolled at Columbia University in New York City where he completed all of his post-secondary education, acquiring five degrees in the process. He studied political science, economics, sociology, and business administration. After receiving his doctorate in political science in 1976, he went to the Center for European Studies at Harvard University of which he would remain an active member and a research associate until June 30, 1999.

Institutional affiliations
At the Harvard Center, Markovits chaired for many years the study group on German Politics as well as one entitled "The Jews in Modern Europe." He founded the quarterly journal German Politics and Society in 1983 which in the meantime has become the foremost scholarly journal on modern German politics in the United States. He participated in many of the center's activities and became one of that institution's mainstays over the years. In turn, the center's uniquely rich intellectual atmosphere and immensely creative interdisciplinarity have had a major hand in forming Markovits's scholarly life.

Between 1977 and 1983, Markovits was an assistant professor in the Department of Government at Wesleyan University in Middletown, Connecticut. Thereafter, he joined the faculty at Boston University where he was associate professor in the Department of Political Science from 1983 until 1992. He then became professor in the Department of Politics at the University of California at Santa Cruz which he chaired until 1995 and where he remained until joining the faculty at the University of Michigan on September 1, 1999. Markovits has been awarded many fellowships, scholarships and research grants. During the academic year of 2002/2003, Markovits was visiting professor of social studies at Harvard University.

He has held academic appointments at a number of universities overseas. Among them have been Dortmund University, Osnabrück University and Bochum University in Germany; Innsbruck University in Austria where he was a Fulbright Professor in the Department of Political Science; St. Gallen University in Switzerland; and The Hebrew University and Tel Aviv University in Israel. He spent the academic year 1998/99 as a Fellow at the Wissenschaftskolleg zu Berlin—Institute for Advanced Study Berlin.

In June 2008, Markovits served as the Dr. Elizabeth Ortner-Chopin Visiting Professor at Webster University in Vienna, Austria.

Andy Markovits was a Fellow in 2008–2009 at the Center for Advanced Study in the Behavioral Sciences (CASBS) at Stanford University.

In the spring term of 2010, Andy Markovits was the Sir Peter Ustinov Professor of the City of Vienna in the Department of Contemporary History of the University of Vienna in Vienna, Austria.

Areas of research and publication
A specialist on the politics of Western and Central Europe—Germany and Austria in particular—Markovits has published nineteen authored and co-authored books as well as edited and co-edited volumes; well over 100 scholarly articles; more than 50 review essays; and many articles and interviews in the American and European press. Markovits's research interests and areas of publication include: German and European labor; German and European social democracy, as well as social movements; German-Jewish relations; Germany's role in the new Europe; Anti-Americanism in Europe; the comparative sociology of modern sports cultures and – most recently – the new dimensions of the human-animal bond, particularly its deeply feminized features. Markovits's scholarly work has been published in English, German, Italian, French, Spanish, Dutch, Swedish, Hungarian, Russian, Ukrainian, Romanian, Chinese, Persian, Hebrew, Korean, and Georgian.

Markovits's latest book publication is entitled Hillel at Michigan 1926/27 – 1945: Struggles of Jewish Identity in a Pivotal Era. His previous book From Property to Family: American Dog Rescue and the Discourse of Compassion, published by the University of Michigan Press in the fall of 2014, garnered the University of Michigan Press's Distinguished Book Award in 2015.

Teaching career
Markovits has won a number of teaching awards at the institutions with which he was affiliated during his academic career. At the University of California, Santa Cruz, he was awarded the "Excellence in Teaching Award" in 1997, distinguishing him as the best teacher on campus that year. At the University of Michigan, he was bestowed the Tronstein Award in 2007 and 2016 for being the best teacher in the Department of Political Science and the Golden Apple Award for being the best instructor on the University of Michigan's Ann Arbor campus.

On March 15, 2009, Markovits received the coveted Arthur F. Thurnau professorship from the University of Michigan. Supported for by the Thurnau Charitable Trust, the Thurnau Professorship is annually bestowed upon five or six tenured faculty from the University of Michigan in recognition of commitment to and investment in undergraduate teaching which has had a significant impact on the intellectual development of their students.

Markovits has advised doctoral dissertations at many major American universities, as well as universities in Great Britain, France, Germany, Austria, Holland, Switzerland, Canada and Israel. On July 4, 2007, Markovits was awarded a Dr. Phil. honoris causa—an honorary doctorate—by the Faculty of Social Sciences of the Leuphana Universität Lüneburg in Lüneburg, Germany.

Bundesverdienstkreuz erster Klasse
Markovits was bestowed the Bundesverdienstkreuz erster Klasse—The Federal Cross of The Order of Merit, First Class—by the president of the Federal Republic of Germany. The Consul General of the Federal Republic of Germany in Chicago handed this award to Markovits on March 14, 2012. This award is the highest honor the Federal Republic of Germany rewards to any civilian, German or foreign.

Personal life
Markovits loves all sports with a clear preference for the team sports of basketball, baseball, football as well as soccer. He is a devoted Manchester United and a New York Yankees fan. He also enjoys all kinds of music with a special penchant for Mozart, Beethoven, Dvořák and the Grateful Dead whom—in his youth and on rare occasions—he would follow on tour on both coasts of the United States. In addition to being a Deadhead, Markovits greatly enjoys the company of golden retrievers who have been his constant companions for three decades. He lives with his wife Kiki in Ann Arbor, Michigan.

Current work

Anti-Americanism
Markovits's academic work comprises three areas of research: first and foremost, he has published a book on anti-Americanism and anti-Semitism in Europe, entitled Uncouth Nation: Why Europe Dislikes America and published by Princeton University Press. This work analyzes resentment towards things American in seven European countries. Going well beyond the conventional realm of politics, Markovits demonstrates that such resentment pervades quotidian culture and discourse.

Sports culture
Second, Markovits continues his work on sports. In particular, he has recently published two books in English: Gaming The World: How Sports Are Reshaping Global Politics and Culture, published by Princeton University Press and Sportista: Female Fandom in the United States, published by Temple University Press. His work on sports has appeared in many languages, including two recent books in German entitled Querpass: Sport und Politik in Europa und den USA and Sport: Motor und Impulssystem für Emanzipation und Diskriminierung.

Animal research
Third, Markovits published a book entitled From Property to Family: American Dog Rescue and the Discourse of Compassion, with the University of Michigan Press. This book describes a "discourse of compassion" that actually alters the way we treat persons and ideas once scorned by the social mainstream. This "culture turn" has also affected our treatment of animals, creating an accompanying "animal turn" which changed them from property to family. One of the new institutions created by this attitudinal and behavioral change towards dogs has been the breed specific canine rescue organization. This work constitutes the first academic research on this significant development.

Memoir
Most recently, Markovits published his memoir The Passport as Home: Comfort in Rootlessness, wherein he discusses his childhood in the west Romanian multicultural city of Timisoara, Vienna and New York, his college years at Columbia University, his close postdoctoral association with the Center for European Studies at Harvard University, and his career at the University of Michigan. His writing touches on his interests in sports, dog rescue, the Grateful Dead, and other topics. Throughout the book, Markovits offers insights on cultural similarities and differences between Europe and America and sheds light on how those distinctions shaped his life.

A German translation of the memoir was published in the fall of 2022 by Neofelis Verlag in Berlin. The title of this edition is Der Pass mein Zuhause: Aufgefangen in Wurzellosigkeit. A Romanian edition published by Editura Hasefer in Bucharest will appear in late spring of 2023.

Notable publications

Memoirs
The Passport as Home: Comfort in Rootlessness

German politics
From Bundesrepublik to Deutschland: German Politics after Unification
German Politics and Society
The German Left: Red, Green, and Beyond
The German Predicament: Memory & Power in the New Europe
The Politics of the West German Trade Unions: Strategies of class and interest representation in growth and crisis

Anti-Americanism
Uncouth Nation: Why Europe Dislikes America
Amerika, dich haßt sich's besser

University of Michigan/Jewish Students History
Hillel at Michigan, 1926/27-1945: Struggles of Jewish Identity in a Pivotal Era (with Kenneth Garner)
The Boundaries of Pluralism: The World of the University of Michigan's Jewish Students from 1897 to 1945 (with Kenneth Garner)

Sport
Offside: Soccer and American Exceptionalism (with Steven L. Hellerman)
Sports Culture Among Undergraduates: A Study of Student-athletes and Students at the University of Michigan
''Gaming the World: How Sports are Reshaping Global Politics and Culture" (with Lars Rensmann)

Notes and references

External links

Andy Markovits
Andy Markovits University of Michigan homepage

1948 births
Columbia College (New York) alumni
Harvard University faculty
Living people
Romanian emigrants to the United States
Romanian Jews
University of Michigan faculty
Wesleyan University faculty
Officers Crosses of the Order of Merit of the Federal Republic of Germany
Columbia Graduate School of Arts and Sciences alumni
Columbia Business School alumni
People from Timișoara
American political scientists
University of California, Santa Cruz faculty